The Cheltenham Association Football League is a football competition based in England and has a total of four divisions. Its top division, Division One, sits at level 14 of the English football league system. It is a feeder to the Gloucestershire Northern Senior League.

The Cheltenham League is affiliated to the Gloucestershire County FA.

Background
The Cheltenham Association Football League is based in and around Cheltenham, providing league football for teams in a 50-mile radius of the town. From its humble beginnings in 1900, the league now boasts 4 divisions, comprising 53 teams and is a feeder league for the Gloucestershire Northern Senior League.

Among the clubs that have left the Cheltenham League and now compete at a higher level are:

Bishop's Cleeve
Cheltenham Town
Cirencester Town
Cheltenham Saracens
Evesham United
Gloucester City

The Herd are another side that progressed from the Cheltenham League to the Hellenic Football League and in more recent years were known as Cirencester United, but the club has now disbanded.

Member clubs 2021–22
Division One North

Division One South

Division Two

Division Three

Source:

Champions

Division One

Source

Divisions Two to Six (recent champions)

Source

List of recent play-off winners

References

External links
League website

 
Football leagues in England
Sports leagues established in 1900
1900 establishments in England
Sport in Cheltenham
Football in Gloucestershire